Chief Jim Beeson Wiwa (1904 – 1 April 2005) was a chief of the Ogoni people of southern Nigeria, and the chairman of the Council of Chiefs of Bane.  He was born in Bane, Rivers State. He was the father of executed playwright and environmentalist Ken Saro-Wiwa and of doctor and human-rights activist Owens Wiwa, and the grandfather of journalist Ken Wiwa.

References

1904 births
2005 deaths
Men centenarians
Nigerian centenarians
Ogoni people
Wiwa family